Howard Mitchell (11 March 1911 in Lyons, Nebraska – 22 June 1988 in Ormond Beach, Florida) was an American cellist and conductor.  He was principal conductor of the National Symphony Orchestra from 1949 to 1969.

According to music critic Ted Libbey, Mitchell "personified the optimism that permeated Washington and America after World War II; he socialized, schmoozed and charmed the ladies of high Washington society, fitting right in, playing the role of music director as he played the cello. He saw the symphony as a necessary component of the city's social and cultural life, an institution to be supported by the enlightened few and used to educate and enrich the many."

Born in Nebraska, Mitchell attended the Peabody Conservatory and graduated with honors from the Curtis Institute of Music in 1935. Mitchell joined the National Symphony Orchestra as principal cellist in 1933.  In addition to playing with the NSO, Mitchell made his conducting debut with the ensemble in 1941, and was named associate conductor in 1946. He was one of two candidates being considered to replace Hans Kindler, and in 1949 Mitchell began the longest tenure of any NSO music director to date, and one especially marked by his campaign to bring great visiting conductors to Washington. Praised for his enthusiasm, deeply involved in the community, a skilled fund-raiser and respected by musicians as one who had risen from the ranks, Mitchell embodied the optimism and “can-do” spirit of the time.

Few conductors anywhere have equaled Mitchell’s extraordinary commitment to community outreach and education. Under his leadership, the NSO presented “Young People’s” and “Tiny Tots” concerts, and a ground-breaking series called “Music for Young America”. The last initiative offered programs free to school groups visiting the Washington area. Mitchell also expanded the orchestra’s touring exponentially, including its first to Europe and an astounding three months of touring Latin America. A hallmark was the inclusion of at least one American work on every concert program. Making use of the burgeoning recording industry, he devised two educational recording anthologies with the NSO. The anthologies were accompanied by study guides, allowing teachers who were not themselves musicians to incorporate music in classroom settings.

On the Westminster label Mitchell made recordings with his orchestra of music by Brahms (Violin Concerto with violinist Julian Olefsky), Copland (Appalachian Spring; Billy the Kid; Fanfare for the Common Man; El Salón México), Creston (Symphonies Nos. 2 & 3) and Shostakovich (Symphony No. 1; The Golden Age ballet suite).

Notes

References
 The John F. Kennedy Center for the Performing Arts

External links

[ Howard Mitchell] at Allmusic
 Howard Mitchell obituary at the New York Times

1911 births
1988 deaths
American male conductors (music)
People from Palm Coast, Florida
Curtis Institute of Music alumni
20th-century American conductors (music)
20th-century American male musicians
National Symphony Orchestra